Mnquma Local Municipality is an administrative area in the Amatole District of the Eastern Cape in South Africa.

Main places
The 2001 census divided the municipality into the following main places:

Politics 

The municipal council consists of sixty-three members elected by mixed-member proportional representation. Thirty-two councillors are elected by first-past-the-post voting in thirty-two wards, while the remaining thirty-one are chosen from party lists so that the total number of party representatives is proportional to the number of votes received. In the election of 1 November 2021 the African National Congress (ANC) won a majority of forty-five seats on the council.
The following table shows the results of the election.

References

External links
 Official website

Local municipalities of the Amatole District Municipality